"Salına Salına Sinsice" ("Swaying Insidiously") is the fourth single taken from Tarkan's 1997 album Ölürüm Sana.  Lyrics and music were credited to Tarkan; although it was a much-loved song at the time of its release, there was some confusion as to who wrote it. The song rose up the Billboard Hot 100 in the singers' native land of Turkey.

Music video
For the music video, Metin Arolat was in charge of Tarkan's hairstyle and clothes. He had worked in the fashion industry and with famous artists in the 1990s.

Extra information
The third track on the album "Salına Salına Sinsice" was remixed when its music video was released. This remixed version was exclusive to the video and was never published on this or any following release.

Tag 
Composer and music: Tarkan
Edit: Ozan Çolakoğlu
Electric guitar: Erdem Sökmen
Percussion: Aydın Karabulut
Bass guitar: James Cruz
Costume: Bahar Korçan

References

External links
 Tarkan Official Web Site
 Listen all the songs of Tarkan

1998 singles
Tarkan (singer) songs
1998 songs
Ultratop 50 Singles (Wallonia) number-one singles
Songs written by Tarkan (singer)
Turkish-language songs